Kaada/Patton is a musical project of two musicians, Kaada and Mike Patton.

Discography
(2004) Romances
(2007) Live
(2016) Bacteria Cult

See also

 Mike Patton
 Ipecac Recordings
 Kaada

External links
Official website
Kaada Homepage
 

Musical duos
Ipecac Recordings artists